Ghalegaun is popular scenic tourist destination with an elevation of 2,100 metres above sea level in Lamjung District.  Ghalegaun is also known as Asia’s model tourism village. It lies in kwholasothar rural Municipality of Nepal. The village is situated at approximately 108 km northwest of Kathmandu and 12.5 km northeast of Pokhara, Nepal. The beautiful tourist village is surrounded by Annapurna Circuit. The SAARC Village Tourism Museum is one of the attraction of Ghalegaun which is inaugurated by Bidhya Devi Bhandari in 2017.

The site visitors are increasing day by day and the village is developed as a model touristic destinations in SAARC countries.

Attractions
 Cutter
 Environmental education
 Family travel
 Nature cruises
 Photography
 Singles tour
 Senior tours
 Religious
 Homestay with cultural program

Mountains seen from Ghalegaun
 Mount Machhapuchare (6693m)
 Mount Annapurna (8091m)
 Mount Annapurna II (7939m)
 Mount Annapurna IV (7525m)
 Mount Lamjung (6932m)
 Mount Bouddha (6974m)
 Himal Chuli (6747m)

Gallery

References

Populated places in Gandaki Province
Hill stations in Nepal